"Tomorrow" is a song by Australian rock band Silverchair, which was released on 16 September 1994 on their debut extended play album, also titled Tomorrow. The song was later released on Frogstomp, the band's debut studio album, in 1995. Written by lead singer and guitarist Daniel Johns and drummer Ben Gillies, it was produced and engineered by Phil McKellar at the national radio station Triple J's studios for SBS-TV's show, Nomad, which aired on 16 June 1994. After the broadcast the band were signed to the Murmur label – a Sony Music subsidiary – which subsequently issued the Tomorrow EP.

"Tomorrow" became a breakthrough hit for Silverchair when it reached number one on the ARIA Singles Chart in October and remained there for six weeks. A re-recorded version was issued in 1995 in the United States and also peaked at number one on both the Billboard Modern Rock Tracks and the Album Rock Tracks charts; it made No. 28 on the Billboard Hot 100 Airplay chart. In the United Kingdom, the song made No. 59 on the UK Singles Chart in September 1995. At the ARIA Music Awards of 1995, the song "Tomorrow" won three awards in the categories 'Single of the Year', 'Highest Selling Single', and 'Breakthrough Artist – Single'; they won two further awards for Frogstomp.

In January 2018, as part of Triple M's "Ozzest 100", the 'most Australian' songs of all time, "Tomorrow" was ranked number 36.

History
Ben Gillies (on drums and percussion) and Daniel Johns (on lead vocals and lead guitar) co-wrote "Tomorrow" when they were performing with Chris Joannou (on bass guitar) as Innocent Criminals. Innocent Criminals entered YouthRock, a competition for school-based bands, in 1994. Early in that year they recorded demos of "Acid Rain", "Cicada", "Pure Massacre", and "Tomorrow" at Platinum Sound Studios. Johns recalled making the demos "[w]e had just recorded that at a really cheap studio ... It cost about $75. We weren't in there for more than an hour. The version we entered went for about six minutes".

In April 1994, the band won a national band competition called Pick Me, using their demo of "Tomorrow". The competition was conducted by the SBS TV show Nomad and Australian Broadcasting Corporation (ABC) alternative radio station Triple J.

As part of the prize, Triple J recorded the song and ABC filmed a video, which was aired on 16 June. For the video's broadcast, they had changed their name to Silverchair (styled as silverchair until 2002). On 16 September, their Triple J recording of "Tomorrow" was released as a four-track extended play with "Acid Rain", "Blind", and "Stoned". From late October, it spent six weeks at number-one on the ARIA Singles Chart. It also reached number one on the New Zealand Singles Chart in February 1995.

In 1995, a re-recorded version of "Tomorrow" (and a new music video) was made for the United States market, becoming the most played song on US modern rock radio that year. In the US it peaked at number one on both the Billboard Modern Rock Tracks and the Album Rock Tracks charts; it made No. 28 on the Billboard Hot 100 Airplay chart. In the United Kingdom, the song made No. 59 on the UK Singles Chart in September 1995.

Inspiration
When asked about where the inspiration for "Tomorrow" came from, Johns said:  That was on a TV show. There was this poor guy taking a rich guy through a hotel to experience the losses of the less fortunate than him. The rich guy is just complaining because he just wants to get out and the poor guy is saying you have to wait till tomorrow to get out. That's one of our least serious songs but it still has meaning to it.

Music videos
Two different music videos were released to promote "Tomorrow". The original version was directed by Robert Hambling for SBS-TV show Nomad, which was produced and directed by Kerry Negara. It was broadcast on 16 June 1994 as part of the group's prize for winning the Pick Me competition.

The second version was shown in the US and directed by Mark Pellington. This video has been described as mirroring the music video for the Pearl Jam song "Jeremy", also directed by Pellington, as well as the work of directors Samuel Bayer and Matt Mahurin. Like many grunge videos popular on MTV at the time, the US "Tomorrow" video includes: harsh lighting, especially on the face; various disturbing images, such as a pig eating money and shots of a spider-like creature; jump cuts between random images; and scribbled handwritten notes. The US version of the video is also known for Daniel Johns wearing a black shirt of the American band Tool. The video's high rotation on MTV "led to an abundance of radio requests".

Reception

ARIA Music Awards
On 20 October 1995, at the ARIA Music Awards, "Tomorrow" won three categories: 'Single of the Year', 'Highest Selling Single', and 'Breakthrough Artist – Single'; the group won two further awards for their work on the related album, Frogstomp. At the ceremony they performed a cover version of Radio Birdman's "New Race" with Tim Rogers (of You Am I) joining them on stage. Their trophies were collected by Josh Shirley, the young son of Frogstomps producer, Kevin Shirley.

Critical response
AllMusic's Stephen Thomas Erlewine described the "angst-ridden single" as "from the standard grunge formula".

In February 2004, Australian rock musician Scott Owen of The Living End was asked for "the most influential Australian music release" and answered that it was Silverchair's "Tomorrow", he explained "it taught kids that if you give it a go you have the chance to take on the world".

Ultimate Guitar placed the song at number 6 on their "Top 10 Grunge Songs That Prove Grunge Never Tried to Kill the Guitar Solo" list. They described it as "An outstanding exercise in quiet-loud dynamics, it features a wah-soaked guitar solo that showcases Johns' exquisite taste for melodic earworms."

Live performances
On 9 December 1995, Silverchair performed the songs "Tomorrow" and "Pure Massacre" on Saturday Night Live, hosted by David Alan Grier.

Soundtrack appearances
"Tomorrow" was used in "The Mystery of Morning Wood", an episode on season six of Beavis and Butt-head, in 1995. At the start of the episode the two main characters are singing Boston's "More Than a Feeling", then concluded that the song was stupid and ended by stating how the video fails to disturb them. The song was also released as downloadable content for the video games Guitar Hero World Tour in 2009, Rock Band in 2010, and Rocksmith 2014 in 2014.

A re-recorded version of "Blind" was used in the film The Cable Guy in 1996 and included on the soundtrack album. "Stoned" was used in the movie Mallrats in 1995 and included on the soundtrack album.

Parody
Australian band Silverpram released a parody version of "Tomorrow", titled "Frogstamp", in 1995. The lyrics of the parody focused on the young age of the Silverchair band members at the time, with the chorus lyrics changed to "I turn four tomorrow." The single peaked at #72 on the Australian ARIA singles chart.

Tomorrow EP and other releases

Personnel
Silverchair members
 Ben Gillies – drums
 Chris Joannou – bass guitar
 Daniel Johns – lead vocals, lead guitar

Production and art work
 Producer, engineer – Phil McKellar
 Producer, recording, mixing (Album Version) – Kevin Shirley
 Mastering (Album Version) – Ted Jensen
 Studios – Triple J studios, Sydney
 Photography – David Anderson

Awards and nominations
ARIA Music Awards

Charts

Weekly charts

Year-end charts

Certifications

References

External links
 Tomorrow at youtube.com

1994 songs
1994 debut singles
APRA Award winners
ARIA Award winners
Grunge songs
Music videos directed by Mark Pellington
Number-one singles in Australia
Number-one singles in New Zealand
Silverchair songs
Song recordings produced by Kevin Shirley
Songs written by Ben Gillies
Songs written by Daniel Johns
Songs about poverty
Songs based on actual events
Murmur (record label) singles
Columbia Records singles